Mary Magdalene is a 1920 German silent drama film directed by Reinhold Schünzel and starring Eduard von Winterstein, Ilka Grüning and Lucie Höflich.

The film's sets were designed by the art director Hans Dreier.

Cast
 Eduard von Winterstein as Meister Anton
 Ilka Grüning as Ehefrau von Meister Anton
 Lucie Höflich as Klara
 Paul Hartmann as Karl
 Reinhold Schünzel as Leonhard
 Eugen Klöpfer as Sekretär
 Jenny Marba as Ehefrau vom Sekretär
 Wilhelm Diegelmann as Bürgermeister
 Fritz Beckmann as Adam
 Gustav Botz as Arzt
 Harry Berber as Kandidat
 Paul Graetz as Der alte Schneider
 Martha Dibbern as Ehefrau des alte Schneider
 Hans Behrendt as Totengräber
 Karl Platen
 Irene Katsch

References

Bibliography
 Bock, Hans-Michael & Bergfelder, Tim. The Concise CineGraph. Encyclopedia of German Cinema. Berghahn Books, 2009.

External links

1920 films
Films of the Weimar Republic
German silent feature films
Films directed by Reinhold Schünzel
German black-and-white films
1920 drama films
German drama films
German films based on plays
Silent drama films
1920s German films
1920s German-language films